Axiomatic geometry may refer to:

 Foundations of geometry: the study of the axioms of geometry.
 Synthetic geometry: the coordinate-free study of geometry.